Am I My Brother's Keeper is the third  studio album by American hip hop duo Kane & Abel. It was released on July 7, 1998, on No Limit Records and Priority Records and was produced by Master P and Beats By the Pound. The album contained the single " Time After Time", which peaked at #18 on the Hot Rap Singles.

Reception
In the US, the album peaked at No. 5 on the Billboard 200 and No. 1 on the Top R&B/Hip-Hop Albums chart and was certified Gold by the RIAA. There was a music video for the  hit single "Time After Time" which was a big success peaking at # 18 on the Hip Hop Charts.
Despite the album's success this was their last album with No Limit Records.

Track listing
 "Time After Time"- 4:11 (featuring Master P & O'Dell)
 "This Is for the Smokers"- 2:27 (featuring Fiend)
 "Tryin 2 Have Sumthin'"- 4:18 (featuring Master P, Fiend & Mo B. Dick)
 "Soldier Story"- 4:57 (featuring Mo B. Dick)
 "Throw Them Thangs"- 3:16 (featuring Magic & C-Murder)
 "Out of Town B's"- 3:52 (featuring Snoop Dogg)
 "Ghetto Day"- 2:59 (featuring D. Marshall)
 "Stress"- 3:57
 "We Don't Care"- 2:26
 "The Game"- 3:48 (featuring Fiend)
 "Watch Me"- 4:09 (featuring Silkk the Shocker, Soulja Slim & Mystikal)
 "Only God Knows"- 2:48 (featuring O'Dell)
 "Call Me When You Need Some"- 3:09 (featuring Master P, Silkk the Shocker &  Sons of Funk)
 "No Limit Niggas"- 3:25 (featuring C-Murder & Fiend)
 "Bout That Combat"- 3:14 (featuring Soulja Slim & Full Blooded)
 "No Turning Back"- 3:41 (featuring Fiend)
 "Betta Kill Me"- 3:44
 "My Hood to Yo Hood"- 2:49 (featuring Snoop Dogg)
 "Am I My Brother's Keeper"- 1:14
 "Gangstafied Forever"- 3:34 (featuring Silkk the Shocker, Mr. Serv-On & O'Dell)
 "Let's Go Get 'Em"- 3:13 (featuring Soulja Slim, Mac, Big Ed, Fiend, Mia X &  Mystikal)
 "Greens, Cornbread & Cabbage"- 5:38 (featuring Master P, Prime Suspects & Mo B. Dick)
 "I Ain't Runnin"- 2:27 (featuring C-Murder)

Sample credits
Time After Time
Cyndi Lauper's Time After Time
Soldier Story
2Pac's Soulja's Story

Album chart positions

Certifications

See also
List of number-one R&B albums of 1998 (U.S.)

References

1998 albums
Kane & Abel (group) albums
No Limit Records albums